Chogoria is a town located in Mwimbi Division of Tharaka-Nithi County of Kenya. It is located roughly 140 miles (about 225 km) from Nairobi. It is connected to the rest of the country by an all-weather, tarmacked road, the Meru-Nairobi highway. The closest town to Chogoria is Chuka. Other surrounding towns are Igoji, Nkubu, Meru and Embu. The town has an urban population of 28,415 and a rural population of 3,208.

Infrastructure 
Chogoria Hospital is a primary healthcare resource for over 350,000 people in the Meru district. It provides maternal and infant care, encompasses a wide network of outpatient clinics, and coordinates youth education programs.

Chogoria is on the widely used hiking trail towards Mount Kenya.

References 

Tharaka-Nithi County
Populated places in Eastern Province (Kenya)